Oedaspis kaszabi is a species of tephritid or fruit flies in the genus Oedaspis of the family Tephritidae.

Distribution
Mongolia.

References

Tephritinae
Insects described in 1973
Diptera of Asia